State Route 372 (SR 372) is a short state highway in Nye County, Nevada, United States. The route connects the town of Pahrump to the southeast side of Death Valley National Park via California State Route 178. The route was formerly a part of State Route 52 until being renumbered in 1976.

Route description

From the state line, the route heads northwest where rural areas surrounding Pahrump come into view after a short distance. Development around the route gets more dense as the route continues easterly through the town. SR 372 comes to an end in the middle of Pahrump, at an intersection with State Route 160.

History

The road that is now SR 372 was established by 1937. The unimproved route was incorporated into the westernmost end of the State Route 52 alignment, which had been redefined to extend from the California state line, through Pahrump and the Humboldt–Toiyabe National Forest north of Charleston Peak, to State Route 5 southeast of Indian Springs.  By 1940, State Route 52 was shown to be discontinuous through the national forest.  The portion of SR 52 west of Pahrump had been improved to a gravel road by 1950, and had been constructed to a paved highway by 1956.

The California–to–Pahrump segment of State Route 52 did not undergo any significant changes for several years after being improved in the 1950s. When Nevada began renumbering its state highways in 1976, however, this portion of SR 52 was renumbered to State Route 372. The new route number was first seen on Nevada's official state highway maps in 1978.  SR 372 has remained relatively unchanged since.

Major intersections

References

372
Pahrump, Nevada
SR 372